The M10 is a rapid transit line in the Asian part of the Istanbul Metro system that leads to Sabiha Gökçen Airport. Initially named and tendered as the M10 Pendik Merkez–Fevzi Çakmak, the line was supposed to complete the link between Pendik railway station and the M4ᴀ extension branch of the M4 line. The tender of this project was later cancelled on 3 January 2018 and on 30 September 2022, a contract was signed with the new contractor company, with a value of ₺2.896.691.000 and works restarted on November 2022.

Starting from the Pendik railway station, the line will head northeast, cut orthogonally the M4ʙ extension branch of the M4 line at Kaynarca Merkez station, join the M4ᴀ extension branch of the M4 line just before Fevzi Çakmak station, and continue to Sabiha Gökçen Airport.

Stations

References

Istanbul Metro
Transport infrastructure under construction in Turkey
Airport rail links in Turkey